The Isha prayer ("night prayer") is one of the five mandatory salah (Islamic prayer). As an Islamic day starts at sunset, the Isha prayer is technically the second prayer of the day. If counted from midnight, it is the fifth prayer of the day.

It is a four rak'ah prayer in Sunni Islam. The two Sunnah rak'ah following the Isha' are highly recommended and so is the three rakat Witr. There are a few optional prayers that can be recited after the Isha' prayer, including the Nafilat ul-Layl prayers (together termed tahajjud), as well as the tarawih in Ramadan.

The five daily prayers collectively are one pillar of the Five Pillars of Islam, in Sunni Islam, and one of the ten Practices of the Religion (Furū al-Dīn) according to Shia Islam.

In Kashmiri, it is known as Khoftan Nemaz. Likewise in Punjabi, it is called Khuftaan di namaz.

Ahadith mentioning virtues

Uthman reported that he heard Muhammad  saying: "The one who offered Isha salat in a congregation, it was as if he remained in salat up to midnight, and he who offered the Fajr salat in a congregation, it was as if he remained in salat the whole night."  (Muslim)

Abu Hurairah reported: The Messenger of Allah said, "The most difficult Salah for the Munafiqeen (the hypocrites) is Isha and Fajr. Had they known the rewards for them, they would have attended them even if they had to crawl on their knees." (Bukhari)

Sunni Muslims
The time period within which the Isha prayer must be recited is the following:

Time begins: According to the Hanafi school, Isha begins when complete darkness has arrived and the white twilight in the sky has disappeared. According to the Maliki, Shafi'i and hanbali schools, the time begins when the red thread has disappeared from the sky. These times can be approximated by using the sun as a measure. When the sun has descended 12 degrees below the horizon, it is approximately equivalent to the disappearance of the red from the sky. For approximating when complete darkness begins, some astronomers argue that it occurs when the sun has descended 15 degrees below the horizon while others use the safer measure of 18 degrees.
Time ends: At the beginning of dawn when the time for Fajr prayer begins. However, it is frowned upon to delay the prayer without a legitimate reason past the first third of the night,  and "night" in Islamic law means the time between the end of the Maghrib prayer and the start of the Fajr prayer. According to an opinion in the Maliki school, the prohibition is from delaying the prayer beyond the first half of the night, rather than just the first third.

Shia Muslims
The time period within which the Isha prayer must be recited is the following:

Time begins: once Maghrib (evening prayer) has been recited and completed.
Time ends: at midnight, the midpoint between shafak and dawn.

However, it is very important to recite the prayer as soon as the time begins. Often Maghrib and Isha are offered together with a small gap of time in between.

See also
Salah (Prayer)
Wudu (Washing of some body parts to prepare oneself for praying)
Other salah:
Fajr prayer (Morning)
Zuhr prayer (Mid-day)
Asr prayer (Afternoon)
Maghrib prayer (Sunset prayer)
Dhikr
Tasbih

References

External links

Salah
Salah terminology